The 1932 Indiana Hoosiers football team was an American football team that represented the Indiana University in the 1932 Big Ten Conference football season. In its second season under head coach Earl C. Hayes, the team compiled a 3–4–1 record (1–4–1 against conference opponents), finished in eighth place in the Big Ten Conference, and was outscored by a total of 76 to 65. The team played its home games at Memorial Stadium in Bloomington, Indiana.

Schedule

References

Indiana
Indiana Hoosiers football seasons
Indiana Hoosiers football